{{DISPLAYTITLE:C7H5NS}}
The molecular formula C7H5NS (molar mass: 135.19 g/mol, exact mass: 135.0143 u) may refer to:

 Benzothiazole
 Phenyl isothiocyanate (PITC)